Swadzim may refer to the following places:
Swadzim, Greater Poland Voivodeship (west-central Poland)
Swadzim, West Pomeranian Voivodeship (north-west Poland)